

Martin Unrein (1 January 1901 – 22 January 1972) was a German general during World War II who commanded several divisions.

Career
Unrein enlisted the German army in the final stages of World War I and then joined the re-established Reichswehr, where he held various regimental posts through the 1930s. In September 1940, he was promoted to lieutenant-colonel and assigned to OKW. On 15 September 1941, he was appointed to command a motorcycle battalion in the 6th Panzer Division. The battalion was almost destroyed fighting outside Moscow, and Unrein was court-martialled, but was absolved of all blame.

On 10 September 1943, he was awarded the Knight's Cross of the Iron Cross. On 29 October of that year, he was appointed to command the 14th Panzer Division, which was shortly to be sent to the Eastern Front. On 26 June 1944, he was awarded the Knight's Cross of the Iron Cross with Oak Leaves. On 11 February, he was promoted to command the III SS Panzer Corps and remained with the Corps until 5 March. On 4 April he was appointed to command the newly formed Panzer Division Clausewitz.

Awards and decorations
 Iron Cross (1914) 2nd Class (5 September 1918)
 Clasp to the Iron Cross (1939) 2nd Class (12 October 1939) & 1st Class (4 July 1940)
 Honour Roll Clasp of the Army (18 April 1943)
 German Cross in Gold on 28 February 1942 as Oberstleutnant in Kradschützen-Bataillon 6
 Knight's Cross of the Iron Cross with Oak Leaves
 Knight's Cross on 10 September 1943 as Oberst and commander of Panzergrenadier-Regiment 4
 515th Oak Leaves on 26 June 1944 as Generalmajor and commander of 14. Panzer-Division

References

Citations

Bibliography

 
 
 

1901 births
1972 deaths
Military personnel from Weimar
Lieutenant generals of the German Army (Wehrmacht)
German Army personnel of World War I
Recipients of the clasp to the Iron Cross, 2nd class
Recipients of the Gold German Cross
Recipients of the Knight's Cross of the Iron Cross with Oak Leaves
German prisoners of war in World War II held by the United States
People from Saxe-Weimar
Recipients of the Order of the Star of Romania
German Army generals of World War II